Torugart Pass is a mountain pass in the Tian Shan mountain range near the border between the Naryn Region of Kyrgyzstan and the Xinjiang Autonomous Region of China. It is one of two border crossings between Kyrgyzstan and China, the other being Erkeshtam, some 165 km (103 mi) to the southwest.

The scenic lake Chatyr-Köl lies near the pass on the Kyrgyz side. The road to Naryn and then to Balykchy and Bishkek—stretching for some —is narrow and in winter often impassable due to heavy snowfall and frequent avalanches.

The pass is also terminus of European route E125 and, under the new National Highway plans, the China National Highway 315, but neither are signed in this area by 2020.

History
The pass was used since antiquity. During the Han dynasty it was under the jurisdiction of a micro-state called Juandu. During the Tang dynasty, the region came under Tang control as part of Anxi Protectorate.

The pass is open to all nationalities but clearance requires careful arrangement of transportation.

A China-Kyrgyzstan-Uzbekistan railway going through Torugart Pass has been in the works that would connect Kashgar and the Ferghana Valley since 2012. However, the Kyrgyz section of the rail has been stalled due to financial and technical issues.

Gallery

See also

 China–Kyrgyzstan border
 Geography of China
 Geography of Kyrgyzstan
 Geostrategy in Central Asia
 Baykurut

References

Mountain passes of China
Mountain passes of Xinjiang
Transport in Xinjiang
Mountain passes of Kyrgyzstan
China–Kyrgyzstan border crossings
Sites along the Silk Road
Tian Shan